The Court of King's Bench of New Brunswick (in French: Cour du Banc du Roi du Nouveau-Brunswick) is the superior trial court of the Canadian province of New Brunswick.

Structure 

The Court of King's Bench of New Brunswick consists of a Chief Justice among 17 judicial seats, plus a number of justices who have elected supernumerary status after many years of service and after having attained eligibility for retirement. This tally does not include the 8 judicial seats assigned for the family court.

Former justices (including district)

References 

New Brunswick courts
New_Brunswick